Chippewas of Nawash Unceded First Nation is an Anishinaabek First Nation from the Bruce Peninsula region in Ontario, Canada. Along with the Saugeen First Nation, they form the Saugeen Ojibway Nation. The Chippewas of Nawash Unceded First Nation currently has a registered membership of 2758 individuals, as of December, 2020. Approximately 700 members live on the main reserve, Neyaashiinigmiing 27 (formerly known as Cape Croker). The First Nation has 3 reserves, Neyaashiinigmiing 27, Cape Croker Hunting Ground 60B and Saugeen and Cape Croker Fishing Islands 1. The size of all reserves is 8083.70 hectares (31.21 sq. mi.).

Government

Current Band Council
Leaders of the Chippewas of Nawash Unceded First Nation are elected every two years by the population registered on the band list.  The next election date has not yet been set however it will be held around the same time in 2021.

The current Chief and Council are:
 Chief Veronica Smith
 Carolynn Wright
 Bernard Keeshig
 Anthony Chegahno
 Arlene Chegahno
 Martha Pedoniquotte
 Sydney Nadjiwon
 Geewadin Elliott
 Nick Saunders
 Solomon King

History 
Neyaashiinigmiing has always been the home of the Chippewas of Nawash. Their traditional lands included the entire Bruce Peninsula and roughly 2 million acres south of it. In 1993, the First Nation won a court battle giving them the right to fish for trade and commerce in their traditional waters surrounding the Bruce Peninsula.

Points of interest

Cape Croker lighthouse

Cape Croker lighthouse is located on the south-east corner of Neyaashiinigmiing. It was first built in 1898, but was replaced in 1902 with the current lighthouse. The lighthouse was the first of its type and was the first to have an electrically ran light and foghorn. The lighthouse is an octagonal lighthouse, with a height of 18 meters/53 feet. The original lighthouse was a wooden lighthouse. The lighthouse has a fresnel light and its range is 24 km.

Cape Croker park
Cape Croker park is a 520-acre park located in Neyaashiinigmiing. Surrounding Sydney Bay. It offers camping and host the Cape Croker tradition pow-wow every year.

The Bruce Trail
The Bruce Trail goes through Neyaashiinigmiing and on some of the bluffs on Neyaashiinigmiing.

Others
The reserve Neyaashiinigmiing is also home to two bluffs the Jones Bluff and the Sydney Bay Bluff, the Bruce trail goes on both of the bluffs.

Name
The name Chippewas of Nawash is from Chief Nawash who fought with Tecumseh during the war of 1812

The name Neyaashiinigmiing  loosely translated from Ojibwe as point of land surrounded on 3 sides by water. Which describes the location of Neyaashiinigmiing 27.

Reserves

Chippewas of Nawash have three reserves in perpetuity, amassing to 71.83 km2 (27.73 sq. mi.). Of these three, the 63.81 km2 (24.64 sq. mi.) Neyaashiinigmiing 27 is considered the main reserve and Saugeen & Cape Croker Fishing Island 1 is shared with Saugeen First Nation.

Neyaashiinigmiing 27

Formerly known as Cape Croker 27, this reserve is located within Bruce County, Ontario. It is 63.81 km2 (24.64 sq mi) big. It is the largest reserve of the three.

Cape Croker Hunting Ground 60B

The reserve is surrounded by Bruce Peninsula National Park and Saugeen Hunting Grounds 60A.

Saugeen and Cape Croker Fishing Islands

The reserve consist of 89 island shared with Saugeen First Nation.

Media

Radio

FM Radio Station
 100.1 - CHFN - The Chippewas of Nawash operate a low power FM station that plays an eclectic mix of Rock, country, gospel, and pow wow.

Print
Local newspaper:
Community Newsletter Eziwehbak (what's happening)
Winter Count: Neyaashiinigmiing's History Newsletter
Dibaudjimoh (no longer publishing)

Culture
The Chippewas of Nawash hold a Traditional Pow Wow every year. Chippewas of Nawash is also the home of musician Ira Nadjiwon, Marc Merilainen (Nadjiwon), Jacques Pigeon, Kevin (The Hooch) Lavalley, and Bryden "Gwiss" Kiwenzie who grew up on Nawash. They are also home to an award-winning powwow singers group called "Chippewa Travellers".

Land claims
In 1994, the Nawash and the Saugeen First Nations filed a lawsuit against the Government of Canada; the claims for land, and payment of rent on lands, discussed in early treaties are significant. "The two First Nations are claiming aboriginal title to the lands under the water covering an area of Lake Huron and Georgian Bay from south of Goderich, west to the international border and north to the mid-point between the tip of the Bruce Peninsula and Manitoulin Island; then east to the mid-point of Georgian Bay and south to the southernmost point of Nottawasaga Bay." This suit has yet to be resolved.

The Official Plan for the Town of Saugeen Shores (2014) includes the following comment about this issue: "The Chippewas of the Saugeen First Nation and the Chippewas of Nawash First Nation have filed a Native Land Claim for the islands in the Saugeen River, the lands that border the north side of the Saugeen River and the shoreline from the mouth of the Saugeen River northerly around the Bruce Peninsula."

Notable members
Kateri Akiwenzie-Damm, poet, founder of Kegedonce Press
 John Borrows (b. 1963), Professor Borrows, B.A., M.A., J.D., LL.M. (Toronto), Ph.D. (Osgoode Hall Law School), LL.D. (Hons.)(Dalhousie) F.R.S.C., is Canada Research Chair in Indigenous Law at the University of Victoria Law School.
 Basil H. Johnston (1929-2015), writer and educator, residential school survivor
 Verna Patronella Johnston, author (Tales of Nokomis) and community organizer in Toronto during the 1960s and 1970s
 Lenore Keeshig-Tobias, author (Emma and the Trees and Bird Talk) and major advocate for Indigenous writers in Canada
 Bryden Gwiss Kiwenzie, musician
 Michelle LaVallee, curator, artist, and educator
 Naomi Smith, artist
 Clifford Solomon, television actor
 Mary Spencer (b. 1984), Canadian, World Champion, Pan AM, and Olympic middleweight boxer

References

External links
 
 "Hope Bay South East Shore Cottager's Group"

 
First Nations governments in Ontario
Communities in Bruce County